Trại Mát station is a railway station in Vietnam on Đà Lạt–Tháp Chàm railway in Đà Lạt, Lâm Đồng.

References 

 
Railway stations in Vietnam